Sergio Miguel is an Angolan chess player. He was awarded the title of FIDE Master in 2019.

Chess career
Miguel represented Angola in the 2012 Chess Olympiad (on board four, finishing on 4.5/7) and in the 2018 Chess Olympiad (board one, 4.5/11).

He qualified to play in the Chess World Cup 2021, where he was defeated 2-0 by Ivan Šarić in the first round.

References

External links 

Sergio Miguel chess games at 365Chess.com

1984 births
Living people
Angolan chess players
Chess FIDE Masters